The 2000–01 Utah State Aggies men's basketball team represented Utah State University in the 2000–01 college basketball season. This was head coach Stew Morrill's 3rd season at Utah State. The Aggies played their home games at the Dee Glen Smith Spectrum and were members of the Big West Conference. They finished the season 28–6, 13–3 to finish second in the regular season standings. They won the Big West tournament to earn an automatic bid to the 2001 NCAA Division I men's basketball tournament as No. 12 seed in the East Region. The Aggies upset No. 5 seed Ohio State in the opening round before falling to No. 4 seed UCLA in the round of 32.

Roster 

Source

Schedule and results

|-
!colspan=9 style=| Non-conference regular season

|-
!colspan=9 style=| Big West Regular Season

|-
!colspan=9 style=| Big West tournament

|-
!colspan=10 style=| NCAA tournament

Source

References

Utah State
Utah State Aggies men's basketball seasons
Utah State
Aggies
Aggies